Ceres International Women's Fraternity is a social women's fraternity focused on Agriculture founded on August 17, 1984 at the International Conclave of FarmHouse fraternity.

History
The 1980 Conclave passed a proposal that pilot women's FH clubs be formed on select campuses and conducted an extensive survey of FH chapters and associations, with 65 percent in support of the creation a women's agricultural fraternity.

A proposal for the “establishment of an agricultural-related women's sorority formed in the image of FarmHouse” was unanimously approved by delegates at the '84 Conclave.

The women involved and a committee of FH men selected the name Ceres Fraternity for the separate women's fraternity. Ceres is the Roman Goddess of agriculture.

On, October 12, 1985 chartered its first chapter at Colorado State University. The International Office for FarmHouse provided staffing and programming support until 1994, when Ceres had grown to the point that it could hire a part-time executive director  to provide support for its chapters and members.

List of chapters
The chapters of Ceres include the following.  Active chapters in bold, inactive chapters in italics.

See also
List of social fraternities and sororities

References

External links

 Ceres
Student organizations established in 1984
International student societies
Student societies in the United States
1984 establishments in Colorado
Women in agriculture